Passiflora nitida, the bell apple, is a tasty, but relatively unknown passion fruit. It is similar to P. laurifolia, with orange-yellow fruits that have a sweet, succulent pulp. It is a fast-growing tropical vine. Its flowers are blue and red, a bit like P. laurifolia and P. quadrangularis. The exact hardiness in unknown, but it is tropical and should be protected from prolonged temperatures below . It is not frost hardy. Passiflora nitida is the cousin of almost all the Passiflora species like P. actinia, P. flavicarpa, P. loefgrenii and so on. Its propagation is by seeds. The fruits are eaten fresh and reportedly quite good in flavor. The bell apple is a native to the Amazon jungle region. Passiflora nitida is also a useful fruit in a drink called Purple Passion. Passiflora nitida has one of the widest geographic ranges. It grows in the tropical lowlands from Costa Rica in the north and French Guiana in the northeast, through wide parts of Brazil.

References

nitida